Eduardo Santos may refer to:
 Eduardo Santos Montejo, Colombian publisher and president of Colombia
 Eduardo Santos (judoka) (born 1983), Brazilian judoka
 Eduardo Yudy Santos (born 1994), Brazilian judoka
 Eduardo Santos (sport shooter), Portuguese sports shooter
 Eduardo Santos (footballer), Czech footballer
 Eduardo Santos Itoiz, Navarrese politician